The 1959 NAIA men's basketball tournament was held in March at Municipal Auditorium in Kansas City, Missouri. The 22nd annual NAIA basketball tournament featured 32 teams playing in a single-elimination format. The 1959 Tournament is the first tournament to use the 16-seed system, which was used until the 2015.

The championship game again featured Tennessee State University. The Tigers defeated the Lutes of Pacific Lutheran University. It would be the first time any school would win three consecutive tournaments; a feat only repeated once, by Kentucky State, in 1970, 1971, and 1972. It was also the first tournament that didn't feature an upset in the championship game and first time a "true" number 1 seed won the tournament since seeding began in 1957.

Awards and honors
Many of the records set by the 1959 tournament have been broken, and many of the awards were established much later:
Leading scorer est. 1963
Leading rebounder est. 1963
Player of the Year est. 1994
Most consecutive tournament victories; continues: 18 overall; 5 in 1959, Tennessee State, 1957-58-59-60
Most rebounds: 32, Ken Remley, West Virginia Wesleyan vs. Whittier (Calif.)
All-time leading scorer; second appearance: Charles Sharp, 5th Southwest Texas State (1957,59,60) 12 games, 118 field goals, 69 free throws, 305 total points, 25.4 average per game
All-time leading scorers; final appearance: Dick Barnett, 3rd, Tennessee State (1956,57,58,59) 18 games, 186 field goals, 79 free throws, 451 total points 25.1 average per game, Charles Curtis, 8th, Pacific Lutheran (Wash.) (1956,57,58,59) 14 games 101 field goals,  85 free throws, 287 total points, 20.5 average per game, Roger Iverson, 20th, Pacific Lutheran (1956,57,58,59) 14 games, 109 field goals, 23 free throws, 241 total points, 17.2 average per game, and John Barnhill, 21st, Tennessee State (1956,57,58,59) 17 games, 104 field goals, 27 free throws, 235 total points, 13.8 average per game.

1959 NAIA bracket

Third-place game
The third-place game featured the losing teams from the national semifinalist to determine 3rd and 4th places in the tournament. This game was played until 1988.

See also
 1959 NCAA University Division basketball tournament
 1959 NCAA College Division basketball tournament

References

NAIA Men's Basketball Championship
Tournament
NAIA men's basketball tournament
NAIA men's basketball tournament